The 2021–22 Brøndby IF season is Brøndby IF's 41st consecutive season in top-division of the Danish football league, the 32nd consecutive in Danish Superliga, and the 56th as a football club. Besides the Superliga, the club is also competing in the Danish Cup and this season's editions of the UEFA Champions League and UEFA Europa League. It is the third season with head coach Niels Frederiksen, after he replaced caretaker manager Martin Retov during the 2019–20 campaign.

Brøndby entered this season as reigning Danish Superliga champions, having won the league title for the first time in 16 years in 2021.

Players

Transfers

In

Out

Competitions

Danish Superliga

League table

Results by round - Regular season

Championship round

Danish Cup

UEFA Champions League

UEFA Europa League

Group stage
The draw for the group stage was held on 27 August 2021.

Statistics

Goalscorers

References

Brøndby IF seasons
Danish football clubs 2021–22 season